Baiddyamari is a small village located in the Mongla Upazila of Bagerhat District, Bangladesh.

Flora and fauna
The surrounding area has tigers. Circa 2007, a woman in Baiddyamari was attacked and killed by a tiger. Tigers have also killed livestock in the village at various times, such as cattle and goats.

See also
 List of villages in Bangladesh
 Sundarbans

References

Villages in Bagerhat District
Villages in Khulna Division